Luigi Brasiello (born 5 August 1960) is an Italian politician.

Biography
Brasiello ran for Mayor of Isernia at the 2013 Italian local elections, leading a centre-left coalition formed by Democratic Party, UDEUR, Union of the Centre, Left Ecology Freedom and Italian Socialist Party. He was elected with the 50,5% and took office on 29 May 2013.

He served as President of the Province of Isernia from October 2014 to October 2015.

See also
2013 Italian local elections
List of mayors of Isernia

References

External links
 

1960 births
Living people
Mayors of Isernia
Presidents of the Province of Isernia
Democratic Party (Italy) politicians